Göbəktala (also, Gebektala and Gobektala) is a village and municipality in the Imishli Rayon of Azerbaijan.  It has a population of 1,393.

References 

Populated places in Imishli District